Enola may refer to:

Places
Enola, Arkansas, USA; a town
Enola, Nebraska, USA; an unincorporated community
Enola, Pennsylvania, USA; a census-designated place
Enola Reef (island), a coral atoll in the Spratley Islands
Mount Vernon–Enola School District, Arkansas, USA; a public school board and district

Facilities and structures
Enola Yard, rail yard in East Pennsboro Township, Pennsylvania, USA
Enola Branch, a railroad segment in Pennsylvania, USA
Enola Low Grade Trail, a wilderness trail in Pennsylvania, USA
Mount Vernon–Enola High School, Mount Vernon, Arkansas, USA; a comprehensive 6-year public secondary school

People
Black Fox, a Cherokee chief
Enola Gay Tibbets, namesake of the WWII Hiroshima nuclear bomber Enola Gay
Constance Enola Morgan (1935-1996), female baseball player

Fictional characters
Enola, fictional character in the 1995 US film Waterworld
Enola Holmes, fictional protagonist, sister of Sherlock and Mycroft, created by the U.S. author Nancy Springer in 2006

Entertainment and media

Literature
ENOLA, a Romanian magazine for lesbian and bisexual women, published since 2006

Music
"Enola Gay" (song), a song by Orchestral Manoeuvres in the Dark about the WWII Hiroshima nuclear bomber
Enola (album), an album from the band I Can Make a Mess Like Nobody's Business, released 2013
Enola (Seigmen album), an album from the Norwegian alternative rock band Seigmen, released 2015
Electronic Tragedy: Enola (album), a 1997 album by P-Model

Other uses
Enola Gay, the aircraft that dropped the world's first atomic bomb, on Hiroshima, Japan, in 1945
 Enola bean, a variety of Mexican yellow bean

See also

Enola earthquake swarm, in Arkansas, USA, in 2010
Ebola (disambiguation)
Alone (disambiguation)